Alohara (Can You Feel It?) is the debut extended play by South Korean singer Goo Hara, a member of South Korean girl group Kara. It was released on July 21, 2015 under DSP Media and distributed by LOEN Entertainment. The EP reached number 4 on Korea's Gaon Weekly Albums Chart. It is the only major solo release by Hara before her death on November 24, 2019.

Release and reception
On July 7, 2015, it was announced that Hara would be making her solo debut, with a video preview of the second single "How About Me?", released the same day. The album's full tracklist was later revealed on July 13.
On July 14, 2015, the album's first single "Choco Chip Cookies", released, featuring rapper Giriboy. The track ranked #21 on Korean music chart.

The second single "How about Me?" was released on July 21, 2015 to promote the mini album.

Promotion 
Hara promoted the singles "Choco Chip Cookies" and "How About Me?" on music shows in July and August 2015 on KBS's Music Bank, MBC's Show! Music Core, SBS's Inkigayo and Mnet's M! Countdown.

Track listing

Charts

Release history

References

2015 EPs
Kakao M EPs